Ninja Turtles: The Next Mutation is an American television series produced by Saban Entertainment, and based on the Teenage Mutant Ninja Turtles characters created by Kevin Eastman and Peter Laird. It ran on the Fox Kids network from 1997 to 1998, and is the first and only live-action television series in the Teenage Mutant Ninja Turtles franchise.

Plot
During their fight against the Foot Clan, the Teenage Mutant Ninja Turtles meet a new turtle named Venus de Milo who uses her skills to defeat Shredder and disband the Foot Clan. Afterward, she helps the Turtles when the Rank led by Dragon Lord escape from their enchanted mirror in a plot to take over the Earth.

Characters

Turtles
 Leonardo (performed by Gabe Khouth and Shishir Inocalla, voiced by Michael Dobson) – The blue-masked turtle who wields a ninjatō and is the leader of the Ninja Turtles. In this show, Leo's mask covers much of the top of his head. During the course of the series, Leo has sought new ways to learn how to combat enemies such as the Rank and Simon Bonesteel.
 Raphael (performed by Mitchell A. Lee Yuen and Dean Choe, voiced by Matt Hill) – The red-masked impulsive turtle who wields two sai. Raph appears to see Bonesteel as his personal enemy, having an entire episode with him.
 Michaelangelo (performed by Jarred Blancard and Larry Lam, voiced by Kirby Morrow) – The orange-masked turtle who wields two tonfas and is self-proclaimed "Prince of All Media" who runs a pirate radio show from the Turtles' jeep.
 Donatello (performed by Richard Yee and David Soo, voiced by Jason Gray-Stanford) – The purple-masked turtle who wields a bō staff and is the genius of the group. A fan of the somewhat insane Dr. Quease, Donnie has tried working with him on a way to send the enemies from the Rank back into the Enchanted Mirror.
 Venus de Milo (performed by Nicole Parker and Leslie Sponberg, voiced by Lalainia Lindbjerg) – A fifth Turtle that wears a light blue mask. Venus was in the bowl the others were in, and doused with ooze. However, she ended up in Chinatown where Chung found her. She was raised as a shinobi, a mystical version of a ninja. Venus often gets sayings mixed up like "piece of cake" and "easy as pie" no matter how much her new family attempts to help.

Allies
 Splinter (performed by Fiona Scott, voiced by Stephen Mendel) – A mutant rat and the adoptive father of the Turtles who trained them in ninjitsu. Splinter is usually not involved with the Turtles' antics, often imparting advice or yelling at them about the noise of their vehicles. He will often play chess at night with his blind human friend Andre.
 Chung I (portrayed by Tseng Chang, voiced by Dale Wilson) – An old friend of Splinter's and Venus' foster father. He trained Venus as a Shinobi, but was killed by the Dragon Lord after the latter used Chung as a conduit to allow his forces to escape their prison dimension and reach the Realm of Dreams. He was also a foe of the vampire Vam Mi, having stolen her heart after defeating her. This later led her to seek revenge on Venus.
 Andre (portrayed by Len Gibson) – A blind man, whom Splinter often plays chess with in the park. During "The Guest", he is evicted from his apartment and given refuge with the Turtles. However, he constantly (much to their frustration) grabbed and messed with everything, nearly injuring them.

Enemies
 Foot Clan – The Foot of this series appear a lot more clumsy and less intelligent (due to comic relief values), much to Shredder's irritation. The Foot Clan is implied to have battled the Turtles constantly for many years, as the Turtles are now 18 years old. When Splinter falls ill, the full fury of the Foot Clan is unleashed upon the Turtles' lair, which has recently been discovered by them. The sheer numbers of the expanding Foot Clan easily overwhelm the Turtles in combat and Shredder then prepares to finish them off, vowing to destroy their leader as well. However, Venus de Milo uses her Shinobi magic, drives Shredder insane by calling the true Oroku Saki to the surface to take control, thereby destroying the Shredder, seemingly forever. Afterwards, the Foot Clan disbands.
 Shredder (portrayed by Patrick Pon, voiced by Doug Parker) – The Shredder appeared in the five–part episode "East Meets West" when he and the Foot Ninjas discovered the Turtles' hideaway. When Venus de Milo came into view, she uses her shinobi abilities to defeat the Shredder, presumably for good and the Foot was disbanded. In the episode "Enemy Of My Enemy", his alias of Oroku Saki was later found on the streets when Dragon Lord's soldiers attack him in order to obtain a ninja amulet called the Golden Shuriken. After Dragon Lord's forces were busy fighting the Turtles, Oroku Saki was defeated and later seen in a deserted alley with the amulet in his possession where he has appeared to have unlocked the power of the ninja amulet and laughs maniacally.
 Rank – The Rank is a group of evil dragons that were trapped in an enchanted glass until they escaped.
 Dragon Lord (performed by Gerald Wong, voiced by Christopher Gaze) – Leader of the Rank and the King of all Dragons. He and his forces were trapped in an enchanted glass years ago and have now escaped. Dragon Lord was the first evil dragon and his charisma lead to other dragons joining him, and thus the banishing of his entire race.
 Wick (performed by Adam Behr and Bill Terezakis, voiced by Lee Tockar) – A small dragon who is Dragon Lord's sidekick. He once drank a power potion he created by accident, temporarily gaining a deep, echoing, English voice along with new powers.
 Rank Lieutenant (performed by Andrew Kavadas) – The head of Dragon Lord's army. He is distinguished from the other by his violet hood.
 Dr. Cornelius Quease (portrayed by Simon Webb) – A world–renowned scientist with discolored skin and expert on mutation and other fields. Donatello is a big fan of his and once worked with him on a device that could have re–imprisoned the dragons. He attempts to create various weapons to defeat the turtles. However, Dragon Lord's ego and desire to consume the turtles usually causes them to backfire. He is also quite insane, and an egomaniac. The Dragon Lord refers to him as a "master of the new magic". After joining the Dragon Lord, Quease adds a yellow labcoat to his outfit along with his red gloves and blue work outfit.
 Silver (portrayed by Garry Chalk) – The last of the Yetis. Instead of living on top of the mountain, he makes his life by going into the crime business and starting a gang of humans who think of him as the smartest boss around. He can't spell, but is otherwise more sophisticated than his moronic henchmen. For some reason, he was able to find out an old man would win the lottery and broke into his home before he found out himself.
 Simon Bonesteel (portrayed by Scott McNeil) – A deranged big-game hunter who specializes in hunting endangered animals. He has collected things off of endangered animals like elephant ivories, baby seal pelts, dolphin hides, and mountain gorilla skulls. Bonesteel considers the Ninja Turtles endangered species as well since there are only five of them as he quotes "I have found a species that will make [all others] seem downright plentiful". Bonesteel possesses a paranoid, anti–social personality and is known to give his weapons female names; he even talks to his weapons, and can be tricked with enough word play. Bonesteel is revealed to have made his home on the roof of an abandoned building. As the series progressed, Bonesteel grew craftier where he logged all the Turtles habits and set traps for them. One such instance is when he attempted to capture Mikey at a pizzeria; another is when the Turtles' instincts have them go out to play frisbee during a full moon. However, Leo also began learning about hunting to counter the traps. In the four–part episode "Unchain My Heart", Simon Bonesteel is also known for hunting supernatural creatures when it came to Vam–Mi and her vampire henchmen. He twice tries forging alliance with them, succeeding with capture and threat of sunlight.
 Heavy Duke (portrayed by Travis MacDonald) – Leader of the Unknowables Street Gang who ruled the 8th Street neighborhood. In a sense of comedy when they steal a boombox, the owner earned their anger by asking who they were. The joke being well... maybe that's why no–one's heard of you. Upon hearing that Mikey was holding a rave in their neighborhood, Heavy Duke decided to crash it and steal the Animal Rights donatation. Adding onto the comedy, his group constantly got in Bonesteel's way of capturing the Turtles. Tricked by Bonesteel, Heavy Duke attempted to capture the Turtles for the cash the hunter promised would come for them. He and Bonesteel ended up becoming human pinatas, humiliated in front of the crowd.
 Vam–Mi (portrayed by Kira Clavell, voiced by Saffron Henderson) – A 10,000–year–old female vampire from China. She was previously defeated by Chung I who tore out her heart plunging her into a long sleep. Her henchmen Bing and Chi Chu used a magic potion to awaken her. However, it was a blunder on Chi Chu's part out of missing her since unless Vam–Mi's heart was returned within 96 hours, she would turn into sludge and never be awoken again. The Turtles used Vam–Mi's link to her heart to lure her into a trap where they reduced her to dust with sunlight after she was teleported to her heart by the Elemental Vampire.

Episodes

Production 
The series introduced many new elements to the Teenage Mutant Ninja Turtles, including a female mutant turtle called Venus (named after the famous statue) and new central antagonists, an army of humanoid dragons known as "The Rank" led by the vicious Dragonlord.

The series was touted in some of the promotional material as a continuation of the 1987 TV series, although it reuses set designs and story elements from the live action film trilogy. Notably, April O'Neil and Casey Jones are absent, and in a departure from other TMNT continuities, Leonardo states in the second episode that the Turtles are not blood-related, while other media explicitly present the Turtles as biological siblings.

Other notable differences were found in the Turtles' weapons; Leonardo carries one double-bladed ninjatō instead of two katana (though he was shown to own two in a few episodes), Donatello has a metal Bō staff instead of a wooden one, Raphael's twin sai could combine to make a staff; and Michaelangelo's signature weapon was a pair of tonfa (his weapon of choice in other media, nunchucks, are outlawed in several places). Further, the name of the series was amended in several European countries to Hero Turtles: The Next Mutation under various censorship rulings, as with most output of the franchise at the time.

The series was shot in Vancouver in British Columbia, Canada.

Power Rangers crossover 
Outside of The Next Mutation, the Turtles also guest-starred alongside the Power Rangers in Power Rangers in Space. The end of the episode "Save Our Ship" leads directly into "Shell Shocked", where the Turtles are summoned and brainwashed by Astronema to fight the Rangers. Her control over them is later broken, and they team up with the Space Rangers to battle Astronema's forces. Before returning to New York, the Turtles have one request from the Rangers: space surfing on the Galaxy Gliders.

Venus de Milo 
The show's most notable contribution to the Turtles mythos was a fifth mutant turtle, a female named Venus de Milo (initially named Mei Pieh Chi), who was skilled in the mystical arts of the shinobi and wears a light blue mask that was braided in the back, giving the appearance of a ponytail. She was also shown to have a lack of knowledge of modern culture and sayings. Venus was portrayed by Nicole Parker and voiced by Lalainia Lindbjerg.

Venus de Milo only appeared in The Next Mutation. In a 2007 interview, director Kevin Munroe elaborated on the instructions Peter Laird gave to him for TMNT. Munroe admitted that among those rules was, "there’s absolutely no mention of Venus de Milo, the female Turtle. You can’t even joke about that with Peter. It’s just one of those things that he hates with a passion".

Home video

VHS
One VHS release consisting of highlights from the "East Meets West" five-episode arc, under the same name, was released by 20th Century Fox Home Entertainment in 1998. In the United Kingdom and Australia, two additional releases were released by Fox in 1999.

DVD

North America
Shout! Factory released the first volume of Ninja Turtles: The Next Mutation on DVD on September 4, 2012. On December 4, 2012 Shout! Factory released the second volume on DVD.

United Kingdom
The complete series of the "Hero Turtles" version was released on DVD in the UK by Maximum Entertainment. The first eight episodes were released on a two-disc set before being separately split into their own releases. Another single volume containing Episodes 9-11 was also release before the rest of the series (Episodes 12-26) was released in a three disc box set.

In addition to these releases, a "Mega Disc" containing the first eight episodes on one disc was also released, alongside a boxset containing the three single volumes that made up the first eleven episodes.

In 2011, twelve single-release DVDs each containing two episodes were released as part of two box sets by Walk Distribution. A complete series set was released by Clear Vision on October 6, 2014, which was also available as two separate volume releases.

Europe
Some foreign territories have released the full-length form of episodes in their native languages, including Germany, France, Israel, Poland and Italy.

Australia/New Zealand

Broadcast
In the United States, the show first aired from 1997 to 1998 on Friday afternoons on Fox Kids.

Distribution rights 
In 2011, Saban regained the rights to the show from Disney Enterprises, which had acquired the Saban Entertainment and Fox Kids/Fox Children’s Productions libraries in 2001. In 2018, the rights were transferred to Hasbro, as part of the acquisition of the Power Rangers brand, which included related intellectual property and content libraries previously owned by Saban Properties. Underlying rights to the original characters have been owned by Nickelodeon since 2009.

References

External links

 
NinjaTurtles.com, the official TMNT website.

1990s American children's television series
1990s American comic science fiction television series
1997 American television series debuts
1998 American television series endings
American children's action television series
American children's adventure television series
American children's fantasy television series
American television shows featuring puppetry
English-language television shows
Fox Kids
Fox Broadcasting Company original programming
Television series about teenagers
Television series about turtles
Television series by Saban Entertainment
Television shows filmed in Vancouver
Television shows set in China
Television shows set in New York City
Power Rangers in Space
Next Mutation
Science fantasy television series